Athlitiki Enosi Lemesou, often abbreviated as AEL, is a Cypriot professional basketball club based in Limassol. The club, nicknamed The Queen, has been one of the most successful team in Cyprus since the beginning of the basketball in the island.

The women's basketball club competes in the Cyprus Women's Basketball Division 1 and is one of the most successful clubs in Cyprus. The club holds the record for the most national championships (16) and most Cypriot Cups won (15).

It participates regularly in European competitions such as the EuroCup Women.

Honours

Players

Current roster

Women's European campaigns

References

External links

AEL Limassol Club Official Website
AEL BC Official website 

Fans and supporters:
 Official SY.F.AEL Fans Website
Lions Radio 
Yellow City 3

Women's basketball teams in Cyprus
Basketball teams established in 1966
Sport in Limassol
1966 establishments in Cyprus